Barrolândia is a municipality located in the Brazilian state of Tocantins. Its population was 5,651 in 2020 and its area is 713 km².

References

Municipalities in Tocantins